Pablo Jacob Martinez (born 11 October 2000) is a footballer who plays as a defender or midfielder for Chippenham Town. Born in England, he represents Wales at youth international level.

Career

Early career
Martinez came through the academy at West Bromwich Albion from the age of 16. He was released from the club at the end of the 2019–20 season, one of five third-year scholars to not be offered a new contract.

Bristol Rovers
Following his release from West Bromwich Albion, Martinez joined League One side Bristol Rovers in August 2020, initially joining up with the club's development squad. In early March 2021, Rovers' manager Joey Barton revealed that Martinez, along with fellow development squad player Zain Walker, had been training with the first-team squad. On 27 March 2021, Martinez made his debut for the club, playing the duration of a 1–0 home defeat to Sunderland. After making eight appearances for the League One side as they finished bottom and were relegated to League Two, the club exercised the option in Martinez's contract for another year. Martinez was released at the end of the 2021–22 season following Rovers' promotion back to League One.

Oxford City (loan)
On 23 October 2020, Martinez joined National League South side Oxford City on an initial three-month loan deal as they looked to gain promotion. He made his debut for the club the following week, coming off of the bench in a 2–0 home defeat to Hampton & Richmond Borough. He scored his first senior goal on 19 January 2021, in a 5–3 victory at Hemel Hempstead Town, Martinez scoring his side's first goal to pull the scores back to 2–1 with a strike from 35 yards out.

Gloucester City (loan)
On 4 March 2022, Martinez joined Gloucester City on a one-month loan deal having found first-team opportunities hard to come by. By joining the National League North club on loan, Martinez linked up with fellow Rovers loanees Lucas Tomlinson and Ollie Hulbert as well as being managed again by former Bristol Rovers Development Squad manager Lee Mansell.

Chippenham Town
Following his release from Bristol Rovers, he joined National League South side Chippenham Town on 15 July 2022  On 13 August 2022, Chippenham's home match against Chelmsford City was postponed after Martinez had collapsed 27 minutes into the match. Following the match, Martinez's club issued a statement that his condition was not life-threatening. On 19 August, a further statement was released stating that Martinez had been fitted with a small heart monitor and would likely be able to return to playing football.

Personal life
Pablo Martinez was born in Oxford, England to a Spanish father and Welsh mother and is eligible for all three national teams. He is a youth international for Wales.

Career Statistics

References

External links

2000 births
Living people
Footballers from Oxford
Welsh footballers
Wales youth international footballers
English footballers
Welsh people of Spanish descent
English people of Welsh descent
English people of Spanish descent
Association football defenders
Reading F.C. players
West Bromwich Albion F.C. players
Bristol Rovers F.C. players
Oxford City F.C. players
Gloucester City A.F.C. players
Chippenham Town F.C. players
National League (English football) players
English Football League players